The 1977–78 IHL season was the 33rd season of the International Hockey League, a North American minor professional league. Nine teams participated in the regular season, and the Toledo Goaldiggers won the Turner Cup.

Regular season

Turner Cup-Playoffs

External links
 Season 1977/78 on hockeydb.com

IHL
International Hockey League (1945–2001) seasons